Kraussia is a flowering plant genus in the family Rubiaceae. Apart from a species in Socotra, they are native to continental Africa. The type was described from a plant collected by Dr. F. Krauss near Durban. It is differentiated from Tricalysia and Empogona by the ovule arrangement inside the ovary cells. The genus contains between 4 and 10 species, including:

 Kraussia floribunda Harv. (1842)
 Kraussia kirkii (Hook.f.) Bullock
 Kraussia socotrana Bridson
 Kraussia speciosa Bullock

References 

 
Rubiaceae genera
Taxonomy articles created by Polbot